The Panama–Pacific International Exposition was a world's fair held in San Francisco, California, United States, from February 20 to December 4, 1915. Its stated purpose was to celebrate the completion of the Panama Canal, but it was widely seen in the city as an opportunity to showcase its recovery from the 1906 earthquake. The fair was constructed on a   site along the northern shore, between the Presidio and Fort Mason, now known as the Marina District.

Exhibits and themes

Among the exhibits at the Exposition was the C. P. Huntington, the first steam locomotive purchased by Southern Pacific Railroad; the locomotive is now on static display at the California State Railroad Museum in Sacramento. A telephone line was also established to New York City so people across the continent could hear the Pacific Ocean. The Liberty Bell traveled by train on a nationwide tour from Philadelphia, Pennsylvania, to attend the exposition.

The 1915 American Grand Prize and Vanderbilt Cup auto races were held February 27 and March 6 on a  circuit set up around the Exposition grounds. The Smithsonian Institution also had an exhibition at the Exposition.

Indigenous representation 
Native American culture was a topic of interest during the nine-month-long exposition with multiple attractions dedicated to Native American life. The most popular attraction at the exposition that depicted Native American life is James Earle Fraser's statue The End of the Trail. Fraser's statue, which showed a Native American man slumped over on a horse, reflected the American idea at the time, that the Native American race was doomed for extinction. The exposition not only celebrated the completion of the Panama Canal, but also advances made by the American people, part of which were the conquests of indigenous people by Americans as well as Europeans. These celebrations over the Native community, can be seen through artworks such as The End of the Trail  and The Pioneer or tributes to Francisco Pizarro and Hernán Cortés. In comparison to previous world fairs, the Panama–Pacific International Exposition showcased Native Americans more as nobles rather than savage people, but who were still inevitably destined to become extinct. These ideas were presented in plays, known as pageants, where Native Americans played small roles such as in “Catalonian dragoons, muleteers, and a tribe of Carmel Indians.” While the demise of Native American people was a rhetoric created by fair organizers, scholars have argued that in reality, the Native persona was very present and did not reflect the idea that it was a disappearing civilization. Indians were in fact part of the fair, but also attended as visitors, performers, and workers. More recently, scholars have focused on Native representation in San Francisco's 1915 rival world fair, San Diego's 1915 Panama-California Exposition, that showed Native American life in a more anthropological light versus this American ideal.

Women and gender roles 
During the Panama–Pacific International Exposition women were in charge of their own board, known as the Woman's Board of San Francisco's Panama–Pacific International Exposition. The board, also called the Board of Lady Managers, allowed women to take part in organizing different aspects of the fair and more importantly gave them the opportunity to have a campaigning platform for discussing women's rights and social issues. It was commonly argued that the fair celebrated male dominance over women by not providing a building for women. Also, men and women were depicted differently in artworks advertising the exposition. White women, specifically, were presented as caretakers while men as strong and powerful saviors, such as in the poster “13th Labor of Hercules.”

At the time, there was an idea of a “New Woman” who was more progressive and advanced intellectually and sexually. This idea of a “New Woman” related to the overarching themes of the fair: modernity, and progress. In efforts to promote the fair, organizers used the “New Woman” as an advertising tactic and proof that San Francisco was an evolving and safe environment for tourists. During the fair, women could be seen posing with agriculture from around the state in celebration of California's produce. All the women were young, beautiful white women who were often the highlight of newspaper articles and events. This use of women presented the idea that they were useful only for their beauty but failed to appreciate their intellectual capacity and physical abilities.

One of the most memorable achievements of the Women's Board was the installation of statues that celebrated women, specifically mothers, known as the Pioneer Mother.

Architecture

The  colored "gems" sparkled in sunlight throughout the day and were illuminated by over 50 powerful electrical searchlights at night.

South of the Tower, the Fountain of Energy flowed at the center of the South Gardens, flanked by the Palace of Horticulture  on the west and the Festival Hall to the east. The arch of the Tower served as the gateway to the Court of the Universe, leading to the Court of the Four Seasons to the west and the Court of Abundance to the east. These courts formed the primary exhibit area for the fair, which included the Palaces of Food Products , Agriculture , Liberal Arts , and Education and Social Economy  and  surrounding the Court of the Four Seasons; and the Palaces of Transportation , Mines and Metallurgy , Varied Industries , and Manufacturers  surrounding the Court of Abundance. 

The central court group was bookended on the east by the Palace of Machinery , the largest of all the halls built for the Exhibition, and on the west by the Palace of Fine Arts , which survives onsite.

Further west into the Presidio, down The Avenue of the Nations, were national and states' buildings, displaying customs and products unique to the area represented. The far western end of the Fair, past the states' pavilions, was reserved for live stock exhibits . At the opposite end of the Fair, near Fort Mason was "The Zone", an avenue of popular amusements and concessions stands.

Construction
Constructed from temporary materials (primarily staff, a combination of plaster and burlap fiber), almost all the fair's various buildings and attractions were pulled down in late 1915. Intended to fall into pieces at the close of the fair (reportedly because the architect believed every great city needed ruins), the only presently-surviving building on the Exposition grounds, Bernard Maybeck's Palace of Fine Arts, remained in place, slowly falling into disrepair. The hall, used to display painting and sculpture during the Fair, was repurposed as a garage for jeeps during World War II. The Palace, including the colonnade with its signature weeping women and rotunda dome, was completely reconstructed in the 1960s and a seismic retrofit was completed in early 2009.  The Exploratorium, an interactive science museum, occupied the northern 2/3 of the Palace from 1969 to 2013; the city-owned Palace of Fine Arts Theater, has occupied the southern 1/3 since 1970.

Several other buildings were saved immediately following the Exposition, including the California, Missouri, and Philippine buildings, which were built on government land.

Other surviving buildings
Buildings from the Exposition that still stand today (other than the Palace of Fine Arts) include what is now called the Bill Graham Civic Auditorium at Civic Center Plaza and the Japanese Tea house, which was barged down the Bay to Belmont, California, and operated successively as a private residence, speakeasy, and restaurant. 

Also surviving are the one-third scale steam locomotives of the Overfair Railroad that operated at the Exposition.  They are maintained in working order at the  Swanton Pacific Railroad Society located on Cal Poly San Luis Obispo's Swanton Ranch just north of Santa Cruz.

The Legion of Honor Museum, in Lincoln Park, was the gift of Alma de Bretteville Spreckels, wife of the sugar magnate and thoroughbred racehorse owner/breeder Adolph B. Spreckels. The building is a full-scale replica of the French Pavilion from the 1915 Panama Pacific International Exposition, which in turn was a  three-quarter-scale version of the Palais de la Légion d'Honneur also known as the Hôtel de Salm in Paris by George Applegarth and H. Guillaume. At the close of the exposition, the French government granted Spreckels permission to construct a permanent replica of the French Pavilion, but World War I delayed the groundbreaking until 1921.

The warehouse for the exposition was moved to Fort Hunter Liggett in South Monterey County and the structure, nicknamed the "Tin Barn", has served as the base fire department for the last 30 years. After its move, it initially served as a horse barn, and since then, it has served as a gym, PX and a movie theater for the base.

Commemorations and legacy

The US Post Office issued a set of four postage stamps to commemorate the exposition, with designs depicting a profile of Vasco Núñez de Balboa (1¢), the Pedro Miguel Locks of the Panama Canal (2¢), the Golden Gate (5¢), and the discovery of San Francisco Bay (10¢). The stamps were first put on sale in 1913, to promote the coming event, and perforated 12, and then reissued in 1914 and 1915, perforated 10. Their prices today range widely; the 2¢ of 1913 is available for under a dollar in used condition, while an unused 10¢ of the scarcer orange-yellow variety in 1915 can be worth up to a thousand United States dollars.

The United States Congress authorized the San Francisco Mint (also known as "The Granite Lady") to issue a series of five commemorative coins. Said coins were the 1915-S silver Panama-Pacific half dollar and four gold coins. The denominations of the gold coins were $1, $ (quarter eagle) and $50 (in two types: a round coin, and an unusual octagonal coin). The Panama-Pacific coins have the distinction of being the first commemorative coins to bear the motto "In God We Trust", and were also the first commemoratives to be struck at a branch mint.  The two lower denomination gold coins are scarce, while the two $50 ones are extremely rare.  The silver half dollar had a mintage of 27,134 and in modestly worn condition is available for several hundred dollars.

Numismatist Farran Zerbe supervised the creation of a series of commemorative medals, an award medal, a souvenir medal, and diplomas.

Centennial
In 2015, the California Historical Society, the Maybeck Foundation, and Innovation Hangar partnered with the City and County of San Francisco to commemorate the centennial of the transformative 1915 Panama Pacific International Exposition.

On June 20, 2015 a commemorative orchestra, chorus and band concert was held at the Palace of Fine Arts to celebrate the 100th anniversary of the fair.

A feature film, When the World Came to San Francisco, which tells the story of the fair, was made by writer and director R. Christian Anderson. It was part of the city's official centennial celebration sanctioned by the California Historical Society. The film had its world premiere at the de Young Fine Arts Museum in Golden Gate Park on October 30, 2015.

Gallery

See also
The Tower of Jewels
The Pioneer, a sculpture by Solon Borglum that debuted at the exposition
Mabel and Fatty Viewing the World's Fair at San Francisco
"Lines on "The Muse Finding the Head of Orpheus" by John E. D. Trask
Golden Gate International Exposition (1939-40 SF World's Fair)
List of world expositions
List of world's fairs

References

Further reading

 Laura A. Ackley, "San Francisco's Jewel City: The Panama-Pacific International Exposition of 1915." Berkeley, CA: Heyday, 2014.
 Lee Bruno, "Panorama: Tales from San Francisco's 1915 Pan-Pacific International Exposition." Petaluma, CA: Cameron+Company, 2014.
 Abigail M. Markwyn, "Empress San Francisco: The Pacific Rim, the Great West, and California at the Panama-Pacific International Exposition." Lincoln, NE: University of Nebraska Press, 2014.
 Sarah J. Moore, Empire on Display: San Francisco's Panama-Pacific International Exposition of 1915. Norman, OK: University of Oklahoma Press, 2013.

External links

Official website of the BIE
Historical photography of the Panama Pacific International Exposition
JB Monaco Panama Pacific International Exposition Photo Gallery
The Panama-Pacific International Exposition at San Francisco, 1915 (1915). From Internet Archive.
Panama-Pacific International Exposition, San Francisco, 1915 (1914) From Internet Archive
Catalogue de luxe of the Department of Fine Arts, Panama-Pacific International Exposition From Internet Archive
Panama-Pacific International Exposition AND mediatype:movies From Internet Archive.
The Panama Pacific International Exposition, from San Francisco Memories
Panama-Pacific International Exposition Map — 1915, from the Virtual Museum of the City of San Francisco
Virtual Tour of the Panama Pacific International Exposition from the History Center at the San Francisco Public Library
Panama-Pacific International Exposition photographic collections, via Calisphere
California Digital Library Guide to the Panama Pacific International Exposition Records at The Bancroft Library
Books about the Exposition at Project Gutenberg

 
History of the West Coast of the United States
1915 in California
1910s in San Francisco